The Lake Bronson Site is an archeological site in Kittson County, Minnesota.  It is a site of Middle Woodland period burial mounds and the site of a Middle/Late Woodland seasonal bison-hunting village.

References

Archaeological sites on the National Register of Historic Places in Minnesota
Geography of Kittson County, Minnesota
National Register of Historic Places in Kittson County, Minnesota